K. Krishna Pillai (7 June 19245 July 1986) was an Indian politician of the Communist Party of India. He was an MLA of Kerala Legislative Assembly who represented Punalur constituency in 2nd session and 4th session. He joined the Royal Navy in 1943, but was dismissed in 1946 for his involvement in the  Bombay Naval Uprising.  He entered politics through the Indian National Congress and later joined the Communist Party of India.

References

Communist Party of India politicians from Kerala
1924 births
1986 deaths